Keith Allen is a professional rugby union referee who represents the Scottish Rugby Union.

Rugby union career

Referee career

Professional career

He has refereed in the Scottish Premiership.

Allen now referees in the Pro14. His debut came in the Scarlets v Zebre match of 13 April 2019.

He is now part of the SRU Elite Referee Panel.

He has been Assistant Referee in the European Rugby Challenge Cup.

International career

Allen has refereed at international level. He took charge of the Rugby Europe match between Georgia and Germany on 10 March 2019.

He has also been Assistant Referee for the Portugal v Namibia match.

Outside of rugby

Allen is a doctor for NHS Scotland.

References

Living people
Scottish rugby union referees
Rugby union officials
Year of birth missing (living people)
United Rugby Championship referees
Super 6 referees